Strawberry Weed is the fifth and most recent studio album by Swedish indie rock band Caesars. It is a double album and was released on 8 March 2008 via Dolores Recordings. The first single to be released from the record was "Boo Boo Goo Goo".

Track listing

Disc 1
 "Fools Parade" – 3:48
 "Waking Up" – 3:40
 "She's Getting High" – 3:24
 "Boo Boo Goo Goo" – 3:50
 "Tough Luck" – 2:50
 "Turn It Off" – 2:21
 "You're Next" – 3:00
 "In My Mind" – 3:08
 "Crystal" – 2:46
 "Every Road Leads Home" – 1:22
 "Strawberry Weed" – 4:06
 "Solina" – 2:59

Disc 2
 "New Breed" – 3:26
 "Stuck with You" – 2:57
 "Down Down Down" – 2:37
 "No Tomorrow" – 3:52
 "In Orbit" – 3:19
 "Easy Star" – 2:59
 "Up All Night" – 2:44
 "Happy Happy" – 0:56
 "Run No More" – 3:26
 "Watching the Moon" – 3:14
 "New Years Day" – 3:48
 "You Nailed Me" – 4:00

Personnel
César Vidal – vocals
Ebbot Lundberg – backing vocals, percussion
David Lindqvist – bass
Nino Keller – drums, vocals, keyboards
Joakim Åhlund – guitar, vocals
Björn Engelmann – mastering
Jockum Nordström – artwork

Charts

References

2008 albums
Caesars (band) albums